Walter Frentz (21 August 1907 – 6 July 2004) was a German cameraman, film producer and photographer, who was considerably involved in the picture propaganda of Nazi Germany.

Frentz was born at Heilbronn. During the Nazi regime in Germany, he worked as a cameraman for Leni Riefenstahl; from 1939 to 1945, he was closely associated with photographing and filming activities of higher echelons of leaders of Nazi Germany, including German dictator Adolf Hitler. He was with Hitler in the  until 24 April 1945.

He died at Überlingen in 2004.

References

Hans Georg Hiller von Gaertringen (Hrsg.): Das Auge des Dritten Reiches. Hitlers Kameramann und Fotograf Walter Frentz. Deutscher Kunstverlag, München 2006, 
Yves le Maner & André Sellier: Bilder aus Dora. Zwangsarbeit im Raketentunnel 1943-1945. Westkreuz-Verlag, Berlin/Bonn 2001,

External links

 
 

1907 births
2004 deaths
Photographers from Baden-Württemberg
Film people from Baden-Württemberg
Nazi propagandists
People from Heilbronn
People from the Kingdom of Württemberg
Luftwaffe personnel of World War II